The 1999 AVC Cup Women's Club Tournament was the 1st staging of the AVC Club Championships. The tournament was held in Ubon Ratchathani, Thailand.

Final standing

Awards
Most Valuable Player
  Park Soo-jeong
Best Setter
  Kim Guy-hyun
Best Spiker
  Chang Yoon-hee

References
Asian Volleyball Confederation

1999
International volleyball competitions hosted by Thailand
1999 in women's volleyball
V
Ubon Ratchathani province